Lupton may refer to:

Places 
In England:
 Lupton, Cumbria
 Lupton, Brixham, an historic manor in Devon

In the United States:
 Lupton, Arizona in Apache County
 Lupton, Michigan, in Ogemaw County
 Lupton City, Chattanooga, Tennessee
 Fort Lupton, Colorado

People 
 Lupton family, business and political dynasty from Leeds, England
 Angela Lynch-Lupton (died 2007), mayor of Galway, Ireland
 Arthur Lupton (1879–1944), English cricketer
 Arnold Lupton (1846–1930), British Liberal Member of Parliament 1906–1910
 Cartter Lupton (1899–1977), American businessman and Coca-Cola Bottling Company magnate
 Dylan Lupton (born 1993), American racing driver
 Ellen Lupton (born 1963), American graphic designer, writer, curator and educator
 Frank Miller Lupton (1854–1888), British governor of Bahr el Ghazal province in Sudan
 Frances Lupton (1821–1892), English activist for girls' education
 Geoffrey Lupton (1882–1949), British member of the Arts and Crafts Movement
 Hugh Lupton (born 1952), British oral storyteller
 John Thomas Lupton (1862–1933), American lawyer, industrialist and philanthropist
 John Lupton (1928–1993), American actor
 John Lupton (footballer) (1878–1954), English footballer
 Lancaster Lupton (1807–1885), American soldier
 Lupton, a villain in the Doctor Who television story Planet of the Spiders
 Peter Lupton (born 1982), English rugby player
 Roger Lupton (1456–1539/40), provost of Eton College, England
 Rosamund Lupton, British author of Sister and other novels
 Ruth Lupton (born 1964), English cricketer
 Terry Lupton, American songwriter and producer
 Thomas Lupton (1640–1684), founding settler of Norwalk, Connecticut, US
 Thomas Goff Lupton (1791–1873), British engraver
 Tony Lupton (born 1957), Australian politician
 Vicky Lupton (born 1972), English racewalker

Other 
 Lupton Stadium, on Texas Christian University in Fort Worth, Texas